The Louisville Panthers were an ice hockey team in the American Hockey League. They played in Louisville, Kentucky. Their home venue was Freedom Hall at the Kentucky Exposition Center. The mascot was a light brown "panther" named Paws. They were affiliates of the Florida Panthers. The team became dormant following the 2000–01 season, until it was resurrected in 2005 as the Iowa Stars. Today, the franchise is known as the Texas Stars.

Notable players
 Roberto Luongo
 Dan Boyle
 Rocky Thompson
 Eric Godard

Career leaders
 Goals: 48 (Paul Brousseau, 1999–01)
 Assists: 63 (Paul Brousseau, 1999–01)
 Points: 111 (Paul Brousseau, 1999–01)
 PIM: 481 (Brent Thompson, 1999–01)

Season-by-season results
Regular season

Playoffs

See also
 Sports in Louisville, Kentucky

References

 
Ice hockey teams in Kentucky
Defunct ice hockey teams in the United States
Ice hockey clubs established in 1999
Ice hockey clubs disestablished in 2001
1999 establishments in Kentucky
2001 disestablishments in Kentucky
Florida Panthers minor league affiliates